Music from the Original Motion Picture: Rize is the soundtrack album to the documentary movie by David LaChapelle, Rize. It was released on June 21, 2005 through Forster Brothers Entertainment and features songs by Flii Stylz, Dizzee Rascal, Christina Aguilera and others.

Track listing

2005 soundtrack albums
Documentary film soundtracks
Hip hop soundtracks